Inquilaab (Urdu: انقلاب, literal English translation: "revolution") is the third studio album and the fourth overall album of the Pakistani band Junoon. Although previous albums by Junoon also achieved considerable success, 'Inquilaab' contained the band's first major hit, the patriotic song "Jazba-e-Junoon". The album also contained the hit "Saeein," which marked Junoon's foray into what later became the sufi rock sound that Junoon is most popularly associated with. Other hits from the album were "Mera Mahi" and "Husan Walo".

Background
Inquilaab was the first hit album by the Pakistani rock band Junoon, released in 1996. It was also the album which marked the beginning of a new genre of Pakistani music that Junoon pioneered - sufi rock, which later on became the genre that Junoon is widely recognized by. The track "Saeein" on the album is Junoon's venture into sufi rock.

The album's only single, "Jazba-e-Junoon" was a huge success all over the country and was the band's first big hit. The single topped through the music charts and began Junoon's dominance in the Pakistani music industry.

It was the first album in which Junoon developed a nationwide fan following, blending rock guitars and bluesy vocals with eastern elements like the use of tablas (traditional south Asian hand drums), raga-inspired melodies, traditional Pakistani folk music, and Eastern inspired poetry.

Track listing
All music written & composed by Salman Ahmad and Sabir Zafar. Except for "Dosti" which is written by Kannan Rashid.

Personnel
All information is taken from the CD.

Junoon
 Ali Azmat - vocals 
 Salman Ahmad- lead guitar, backing vocals
Brian O'Connell - bass guitar, backing vocals

Additional musicians
Drums by Malcolm Goveas
Tablas and Dholak by Ashiq Ali Mir

Production
Produced by Salman Ahmad & Brian O'Connell Co-produced on "Saeein" by Rohail Hyatt
Produced, Recorded & Mixed at Aamir Hasan Studio in Karachi, Pakistan
Mixing, engineering and sound production by Aamir Hasan
Additional Mixing by Tahir Gul Hassan
Assistant Recording engineer by N.Z. Rowdy and Ehtisham-ul-Haq
"Iltija" and "Mera Mahi" recorded at Sound on Sound Studios and "Saeein" at Pyramid Studios.
Mastered at Nizar Lalani Studios
Assisted by Shehzad Hasan & Tabish
Photography by Arif Mehmood
Album art concept by Salman Ahmad

External links
Official Website

1996 albums
Junoon (band) albums
Urdu-language albums